, often called  or simply , is a football stadium located in Midori-ku, Saitama, Saitama Prefecture, Japan.

Currently, J1 League club Urawa Red Diamonds use this stadium for home games. It is the largest football-specific stadium in Japan and is one of the largest stadiums in Asia. It has hosted the semi-finals of both the 2002 FIFA World Cup and the football tournament at the 2020 Summer Olympics. It is also the home stadium of Japan national football team in almost every FIFA World Cup qualifying matches.

Location
The stadium is a 15 to 20 minute walk from Urawa-Misono Station on the Saitama Railway Line.

History
Built by Azusa Sekkei to host matches of the 2002 FIFA World Cup, construction was completed in September 2001. The stadium holds 63,700 people, although for segregation reasons league games hosted at the ground have a reduced capacity of 62,300. The Saitama Stadium hosted four matches during the 2002 FIFA World Cup, including co-host Japan's first match against Belgium.

Between 2005 and 2007, the Urawa Red Diamonds' local derby rival Omiya Ardija hosted matches here along with Urawa Komaba due to expansion of its home Ōmiya Park Soccer Stadium.

2002 FIFA World Cup
The stadium was one of the venues of the 2002 FIFA World Cup, and held the following matches:

Features
Building area: 54,420m²
Total floor area: 62,674m²
Covered area: 29,000m²
Stand inclination: Max. 30 degree angle

Gallery

References

External links

  
 Stadium Guide Article

Sports venues in Saitama (city)
Urawa Red Diamonds
2002 FIFA World Cup stadiums in Japan
Venues of the 2020 Summer Olympics
Football venues in Japan
Sports venues completed in 2001
Olympic football venues
2001 establishments in Japan